The Andrew M. Hargis House is a historic house in Grand Island, Nebraska. It was built in 1898 for Andrew M. Hargis, a co-founder of the Grand Island Business and Normal College, and designed in the Queen Anne architectural style. It was purchased by banker F. J. Coates in 1913, and it became the Grand Island Women's Club in 1953. It has been listed on the National Register of Historic Places since June 9, 1978.

References

National Register of Historic Places in Hall County, Nebraska
Queen Anne architecture in Nebraska
Houses completed in 1898